Municipal elections were held in the Czech Republic on 23 and 24 September 2022.

Campaign

Mayors and Independents (STAN) 
STAN launched the spring phase of its campaign on 19 April 2022. Party leader Vít Rakušan called it a "key election" and the party thus chose a Key as a symbol for the party campaign. Rakušan stated that the party wants to show smart and inspirative solutions from experience. The party also introduced the "I want to run" ("Chci kandidovat") project, which aims to help people enter politics.

Result

See also
 2022 Brno municipal election
 2022 Prague municipal election
 2022 Plzeň municipal election
 2022 Ostrava municipal election

References

External links

2018
2022 elections in the Czech Republic
October 2022 events in Europe